Nikolayevka is a rural locality in Gorodensky Selsoviet Rural Settlement, Lgovsky District, Kursk Oblast, Russia. Population:

Geography 
The village is located in the Seym River basin, 51 km from the Russia–Ukraine border, 53 km south-west of Kursk, 13 km south-east of the district center – the town Lgov, 6.5 km from the selsoviet center – Gorodensk.

 Climate
Nikolayevka has a warm-summer humid continental climate (Dfb in the Köppen climate classification).

Transport 
Nikolayevka is located 4 km from the road of regional importance  (Kursk – Lgov – Rylsk – border with Ukraine) as part of the European route E38, on the road of intermunicipal significance  (38K-017 – Malyye Ugony – Pogorelovka), 4 km from the nearest railway halt 412 km (railway line Lgov I — Kursk).

The rural locality is situated 60 km from Kursk Vostochny Airport, 136 km from Belgorod International Airport and 263 km from Voronezh Peter the Great Airport.

References

Notes

Sources

Rural localities in Lgovsky District